Rudolf "Ruud" Frederik Otto van Feggelen (14 April 1924 – 9 August 2002) was a Dutch water polo competitor and coach.

History 
He won a European title in 1950 and was the best Dutch player at the 1948 and 1952 Summer Olympics, scoring 16 goals in 1948 and 18 goals in 1952; his teams placed third and fifth, respectively. After retirement, he coached the national team between 1962 and 1966. In his honor, the Ruud van Feggelen-Award was established to distinguish the water polo player of the year in the Netherlands.

Van Feggelen was born to Ms. I. van Feggelen-Hogendijken and Mr. G.J.M. van Feggelen; his elder sister Iet van Feggelen was an international swimmer. Feggelen got married on 20 October 1949.

See also
 Netherlands men's Olympic water polo team records and statistics
 List of Olympic medalists in water polo (men)
 List of men's Olympic water polo tournament top goalscorers

References

External links

 

1924 births
2002 deaths
Dutch male water polo players
Olympic bronze medalists for the Netherlands in water polo
Water polo players at the 1948 Summer Olympics
Medalists at the 1948 Summer Olympics
Water polo players at the 1952 Summer Olympics
Water polo players from Amsterdam
Dutch water polo coaches
20th-century Dutch people
Olympic coaches